Dance in the Vampire Bund is an anime series adapted from the manga of the same title by Nozomu Tamaki. Produced by Shaft and directed by Akiyuki Shinbo, Dance in the Vampire Bund began broadcasting in Japan on AT-X between January 7 to April 1, 2010. Hiroyuki Yoshino wrote the series composition, Akio Dobashi composed the series music, and Naoyuki Konno designed the characters. Konno served as chief animation director for the series, and was joined by Yasutoshi Iwasaki and Fumio Matsumoto for the final episode. Although produced by Shaft, the series was practically a co-production with A.C.G.T. Episodes 5, 7–8, and 10 were outsourced to Studio Pastoral.

In March 2010, Funimation licensed the series for an English-language release in North America.

Episode list

Notes

References

Dance in the Vampire Bund